The Case of the Lucky Legs is a 1935 mystery film, the third in a series of Perry Mason films starring Warren William as the famed lawyer.

Plot

Margie Clune wins the "Lucky Legs" beauty contest concocted by Frank Patton, but has trouble collecting her $1,000 prize when the promoter skips town. It turns out it is all a scam he has pulled before. When he later turns up stabbed to death, she is a strong suspect.

Cast
 Warren William as Perry Mason
 Genevieve Tobin as Della Street
 Patricia Ellis as Margie Clune
 Lyle Talbot as Dr. Bob Doray
 Allen Jenkins as Spudsy Drake, Mason's private investigator
 Barton MacLane as Police Chief Bisonette
 Peggy Shannon as Thelma Bell
 Porter Hall as Bradbury
 Anita Kerry as Eva Lamont
 Craig Reynolds as Frank Patton
 Henry O'Neill as District Attorney Manchester
 Charles Wilson as Police Officer Ricker
 Joseph Crehan as Detective Johnson
 Olin Howland as Dr. Croker, Perry's doctor
 Mary Treen as Spudsy's wife

Critical reception
Writing for The Spectator in 1936, Graham Greene praised the film as "an admirable film" sadly partnered as makeweight to I Give My Heart (a film Greene characterized as appalling). Comparing the character of Perry Mason to other similar fictional detectives like Sherlock Holmes, Lord Peter Wimsey, Charlie Chan, and those created by William Powell, Greene concludes that Mason is his favorite film detective because he is a more genuine creation and recommends the film as "good Mason if not good detection".

Home media
On October 23, 2012, Warner Home Video released the film on DVD in Region 1 via their Warner Archive Collection alongside The Case of the Howling Dog, The Case of the Curious Bride, The Case of the Velvet Claws, The Case of the Black Cat and  The Case of the Stuttering Bishop in a set entitled Perry Mason: The Original Warner Bros. Movies Collection. This is a manufacture-on-demand (MOD) release, available exclusively through Warner's online store and only in the US.

"The Case of the Lucky Legs" was remade for the Perry Mason (1957 TV series), Season three; episode 10, first shown December 19, 1959.

References

External links
 
 
 
 

1935 films
American black-and-white films
American mystery films
Warner Bros. films
Films directed by Archie Mayo
1935 crime films
Films based on American novels
Films based on mystery novels
Perry Mason
Films about beauty pageants
1935 mystery films
American crime films
1930s English-language films
1930s American films